Gaston Ghrenassia  (born 11 December 1938), known by his stage name Enrico Macias, is a French singer, songwriter and musician of Algerian Jewish descent.

Early years
Gaston Ghrenassia was born to a Sephardic Algerian Jewish family in Constantine, Algeria. His father, Sylvain Ghrenassia (1914–2004), was a violinist in an orchestra that played primarily malouf, Andalusian classical music. Gaston played the guitar from childhood, and started playing with the Cheikh Raymond Leyris Orchestra at age 15.

He pursued a school teacher career, but continued playing the guitar. In 1961, the Algerian War of Independence was raging, and the situation became untenable for the Jewish and European residents of Constantine. The assassination in 1961 of his father-in-law and musician Cheikh Raymond Leyris by the National Liberation Front (FLN) was of immense effect on Gaston Ghrenassia, and appears to have been due to his opposition to the independence of Algeria from France. Gaston left Algeria with his wife, Suzy, on 29 July 1961, eleven months before the end of the Algerian War of Independence, and went into exile in mainland France. He has not been permitted to return to Algeria ever since.

Career

First living in Argenteuil, he eventually moved to Paris, where he decided to pursue a career in music. At first he tried translating into French the malouf numbers which he already knew. Later on, he developed a new French repertoire that he performed in cafés and cabarets. He remained, though, a popular interpreter of Arab-Andalusian music and Judeo-Arab songs in France.

He adopted the stage name Enrico Macias and made his first recording in 1962 after a meeting with Raymond Bernard of Pathé. The result was the recording of "Adieu mon pays" which he had composed for his beloved Algeria on the boat on his way to France. He appeared on French television and became an overnight sensation. This led to a first tour in 1963 as a second act with Paola and Billy Bridge. His daughter, Jocya, was also born that year.

In spring 1964, he opened for Les Compagnons de la chanson at the Paris Olympia and then undertook a successful tour of the Middle East, performing with great success in Israel, Greece and Turkey, especially in the latter where he still has a huge following. In Turkey, many of his songs were translated and interpreted by Turkish artists. In 1965, he was awarded the Prix Vincent Scotto, and the following year he sang before 120,000 people at the Dinamo Stadium in Moscow, performing concerts in more than 40 other Soviet cities. He also toured Japan and recorded titles in Spanish and Italian and was popular in both countries.

His American debut, at a sold-out Carnegie Hall concert, took place on 17 February 1968. He continued to tour the United States, singing in Chicago, Dallas and Los Angeles. In Quebec, Canada, he was warmly welcomed as a Francophone artist.

In 1971, he returned to the Paris Olympia, then went to the Royal Albert Hall in London, and back to Japan, Canada, Italy and Spain. A second US tour culminated in a concert at Carnegie Hall in 1972. In 1974, he gave ten shows at the Uris Theater on Broadway, and also at the Olympia for the sixth time since his debut.

He toured France and went twice to Israel in 1976 and 1978. He was invited to Egypt by the Egyptian President Anwar El Sadat to sing for peace. This came after Macias had been banned from Arab countries for many years, despite keeping his popularity with Arab and ethnic audiences in the Middle East and North Africa. In Egypt, he sang in front of 20,000 people at the foot of the Pyramids. After Sadat's assassination, he wrote a song dedicated to the late president entitled "Un berger vient de tomber".

In 1988, he had a big hit with "Zingarella", particularly in Israel and Turkey upon his tour in both countries in addition to South Korea.

In April 1992, he tried acting in a play adapted from English, called Quelle Nuit. He also had a role as a local judge in the French TV film Monsieur Molina.

In July 2019, Macias played himself in the comedy Family Business, broadcast on Netflix.

Albums and singles
Of great popularity were his 1960s Oriental-influenced songs like "Adieu mon pays" (also known as "J'ai quitté mon pays"), "Les filles de mon pays", "L'Oriental", "Entre l'orient et l'occident" and tribute songs like "Le violon de mon père" (to his father), and "Mon chanteur préferé" (a tribute to his father-in-law Cheikh Raymond).

He was also popular with the French interpretation of "'Oh guitare, guitare" and the Spanish versions of "El Porompompero" and "Solenzara".

Big French hits include "Paris, tu m'as pris dans tes bras", "La femme de mon ami", "Non je n'ai pas oublié", "La France de mon enfance", "Les gens du nord" and "Les filles de mon pays".

He has sung in many languages including French, Italian, Spanish, Hebrew, Turkish, Greek, English, Armenian, Arabic and many of its dialects, and recently in Yiddish.

Achievements
In 1965 he was awarded the Prix Vincent Scotto.
He received a gold disc in 1976 for "Mélisa".
He was named Singer of Peace by UN Secretary-General Kurt Waldheim in 1980 after he donated the proceeds of his single "Malheur à celui qui blesse un enfant" to the Unicef
In 1997, Kofi Annan named him Roving Ambassador for Peace and the Defence of Children.

Collaborations
He has collaborated with numerous artists and his songs have been interpreted in many languages.
He sang "Melisa", "Je t'apprendrai l'amour", "Un grand amour" and "On s'embrasse et on oublie" as a duet with internationally famous Turkish singer Ajda Pekkan and they released a live album called "A L'Olympia" together in 1976.
In 1991, he had a duet with Ginni Gallan entitled "Un amour, une amie".
In 2003, he sang "Koum Tara" with Cheb Mami featured in the latter's album Du Sud au Nord and again a live version, this time on Cheb Mami's 2004 album Live au Grand Rex
In Turkey, many artists have interpreted his songs with Turkish lyrics including Ajda Pekkan, Başar Tamer, Berkant, Engin Evin, Ferdi Özbeğen, Gökben, Gönül Yazar, Hümeyra, İhsan Kayral, Juanito, Kamuran Akkor, Mavi Çocuklar, Nilüfer, Ömür Göksel, Selçuk Ural, Semiramis Pekkan, Seyyal Taner, Sezer Güvenirgil, Sibel Egemen, Tanju Okan, Yeliz

Controversies
His decision to try to play concerts in Algeria resulted in huge controversy. After the cancellation of a proposed tour in Algeria in 2000, he wrote a book Mon Algérie (Editions Plon in October 2001) marketed as a "veritable love story between one man and his homeland".

On 14 February 2007, he announced his support of Nicolas Sarkozy for the French presidential elections. He confirmed his political convictions of the political left, but said he could not support the Socialist candidate Ségolène Royal, although he would have supported Laurent Fabius or Dominique Strauss-Kahn if they had been the candidates.

He attempted again unsuccessfully to visit Algeria in November 2007 accompanying French president Nicolas Sarkozy, but was faced with fierce resistance from several Algerian organizations and individuals, including Algerian Prime Minister Abdelaziz Belkhadem, due to his support of Israel. He has never been permitted to return to Algeria since he left in 1961.

Personal life
Enrico is a widower. His wife Suzy Leyris died on 23 December 2008. His 1993 album Suzy is dedicated to her.
He has a daughter Jocya Macias and his son, Jean-Claude Ghrenassia, is a well-known music producer as well.

Discography

Albums
Charts

Studio albums
1983: Deux ailes et trois plumes
1984: Générosité
1987: Enrico
1989: Le vent du sud
1991: Enrico
1992: Mon chanteur préferé
1993: Suzy
1994: La France de mon enfance
1995: Et Johnny Chante L'amour
1999: Aie Aie Aie Je T'Aime
1999: Hommage à Cheikh Raymond
2003: Oranges amères
2005: Chanter
2006: La Vie populaire
2011: Voyage d'une mélodie
2012: Venez tous mes amis!
2016: Les clefs
2019: Enrico Macias & Al orchestra

Live albums / compilations
1968: Olympia 68
1989: Olympia 89
1990: Disque d'Or
1992: Le plus grand bonheur du monde
1996: La Fête à l'Olympia
2003: Les Indispensables de Enrico Macias
2003: Concerts Musicorama
2006: Olympia 2003
2006: Les Concerts Exclusifs Europe
2008: Platinum Collection

Songs
(Macias songs in alphabetical order)

A

 A ceux qui m'ont béni 1981
 A la face de l'humanité 1972
 A Venise 1971
 Adieu mon pays 1962
 Aie aie aie je t'aime 1989
 Aime-moi je t'aime 1986
 Aimez vous les uns les autres 1977
 L'âme des gitans 1977
 Ami, dis lui 1965
 L'ami fidèle 1964
 L'amour c'est pour rien 1964
 L'amour de la famille 1978
 L'amour n'est jamais fini 1979 
 Apprendre à vivre ensemble 1995
 Après moi 1989
 Asturias 1970
 Au cœur de la Camargue 1963
 Au nom des droits de l'homme 1993
 Au temps du Balajo 1970
 Aux quatre coins du monde 1968  
 Aux talons de ses souliers 1968
 Avec les moyens du bord 1983

B

 La ballade des innocents 1987
 Beyrouth 1963
 Brésil 1995

C

 C'est ça l'amour 1973
 C'est du soleil 1971
 C'est une femme 1981
 C'est vrai 1980
 C'était le bon temps 1973
 Chanson pour l'auvergnat 1974/1997
 Chanter 1966
 Chiquita 1962
 Come on bye bye 1991
 Compagnon disparu 1963
 Constantina 1984
 Constantine 1962
 La courte échelle 1981

D

 Dans la nuit mexicaine 1963
 De musique en musique  1969
 Dès que je me réveille 1968
 Deux ailes et trois plumes 1983
 Deux femmes a Dublin 1976
 Dieu de l'espérance 1993
 Dis-moi ce qui ne va pas 1968
 Dis-moi l'avenir 1973
 Dix ans déjà 1970

E

 El Porompompero 1964
 Elle reviendra bientôt 1975
 L'Enfant de mon enfant (Mon petit Symon) 1993
 Enfants de tous pays 1963
 Entre l'orient et l'occident 1976
 Est-il un ennemi? 1965

F

 La femme de mon ami 1962
 La fête orientale 1971
 Les Filles de mon pays 1964
 La folle espérance 1977
 La France de mon enfance 1980
 Le fusil rouillé 1984

G

 Générosité 1984
 Les gens du nord 1967
 Le grain de blé 1966
 Le grand pardon 1997

I

 L'île du Rhône, 1964 ?
 Il est comme le soleil 1977
 L'instituteur 1981

J

 J'ai douze ans 1989
 J'ai peur 1967
 J'appelle le soleil 1966
 Jalousie maladie 1975
 Jamais Deux Sans Trois 1966
 J'en ai plein mon cœur des souvenirs 1966
 Je crois en Dieu 1971
 Je le vois sur ton visage 1967
 Je n'ai pas vu mes enfants grandir 1984
 Je t'aimerai pour deux 1966
 Je vous apporte la nouvelle 1975 
 Jérusalem j'ai froid 1988
 Juif Espagnol 1980
 Jusqu'au bout de la course 1981

K

 Koum Tara 1976 + avec Cheb Mami (reprise) 1999

L

 La lavande 1967
 Luther King 1984
 La dernière prière 1996

M

 Ma maison, ma maison 1962
 Ma patrie 1964
 Ma raison de vivre 1964
 Malheur à celui qui blesse un enfant (Enrico Macias et Jacques Demarny) 1975
 La Marelle 1977
 Maya 1964
 Mélisa 1975
 Le mendiant de l'amour 1980
 La mère et l'enfant 1989
 Les millionnaires du dimanche 1967
 Mon ami mon frère 1963
 Mon chanteur préféré 1986
 Mon cœur d'attache 1966

N

 N'oublie jamais d'où tu viens 1967
 Ne doute plus de moi 1964
 Noël à Jérusalem 1967
 Non je n'ai pas oublié 1966
 Notre place au soleil 1965

O

 Oh guitare, guitare 1962
 Oranges amères 2003
 L'Oriental 1962
 Où est donc la vérité 1966
 Oumparere 1975
 Ouvre-moi la porte 1980
 Ouvre ta main et donne 1963

P

 Par ton premier baiser 1962
 Pardonne et n'oublie pas 1984
 Paris s'allume 1969
 Paris tu m'as pris dans tes bras 1964
 La part du pauvre 1966
 Les pins du bord de l'eau 1964
 Le plus grand bonheur du monde 1967
 Poï Poï 1963
 Pour ton mariage (chantée avec sa fille) 1992
 Puisque l'amour commande 1967

Q

 Quand les femmes dansent 2003
 Quand les hommes vivront d'amour, à l'Olympia en 1989 avec les Petits Chanteurs d'Asnières

R

 Reste-moi fidèle 1969

S

 Sans voir le jour 1965
 S'il fallait tout donner 1964
 Si c'était à refaire 1977
 Sois fidèle à ton amour 1974 avec Ilanit
 Solenzara 1967
 Sous le ciel de Paris 2005
 Souviens-toi des noëls de là bas 1963
 Souviens-toi, je t'aime aujourd'hui 1975
 Suzy 1993

T

 Toi la mer immense 1967
 Tous les hommes se ressemblent 1970
 Tous les soleils de l'amitié 1981
 Tout seul 1966
 Tu n'es pas seul au monde 2011

U

 Un amour, une amie 1990 avec Ginni Gallan
 Un berger vient de tomber 1981
 Un rayon de soleil 1967
 Un refrain 1967
 Un signe de la main 1975
 Un soir d'été 1963
 Une fille à marier 1982

V

 Va-t'en 1962
 Vagabonds sans rivage 1963
 Le Vent du sud 1989
 Vers qui vers quoi 1988
 Le Vertige 1974
 La vie populaire 2005
 Vieille terre 1965
 Le violon de mon père 1977
 Vous les femmes 1965
 Le Voyage 2003

Y

 Les yeux de l'amour 1967

Z

 Zingarella 1988

Featured in

Filmography
1965: L'Esbrouffe or Déclic et des claques directed by Philippe Clair – as himself
1978: Mamma Rosa ou La farce du destin directed by Raoul Sangla (TV mini-series)
2001: La Vérité si je mens! 2 directed by Thomas Gilou – as Maurice Boudboul
2003: Les clés de bagnole directed by Laurent Baffie – as a comedian
2005: Monsieur Molina directed by Thierry Binisti – as judge (TV series)
2006: Un ticket pour l'éspace directed by Eric Lartigau – Enrico (voice)
2009: Coco directed by Gad Elmaleh as designer
2011: Bienvenue à bord directed by Eric Lavaine – as himself
2012: La Vérité si je mens! 3 by Thomas Gilou – as Maurice Boudboul
2012: Scènes de ménages: ce soir, ils reçoivent – as a priest (TV series)
2019: Family Business – as himself (Netflix series)

Soundtracks
1967: Le parapluie des vedettes (TV movie) – singing "Les millionnaires du dimanche"
1994: Ha-Perah Be-Gani (documentary) – writing the music for "Marlène"
1994: Mina Tannenbaum – "Les filles de mon pays" (composer)
1998: A Soldier's Daughter Never Cries – writing and performing "Mon coeur d'attache"
2010: Axis of Evil (short film) – singing "J'ai quitté mon pays" 
2011: Le Chat du rabbin – singing "Qu'elle ne se marie pas"
2011: Bachelor Days Are Over – writing and performing "Reste-moi fidèle"
2011: Bienvenue à bord – performing "Le mendiant de l'amour", "Les filles de mon pays", "Enfants de tous pays" and "Tu es le soleil de ma vie"

Documentaries
1966: Paris aktuell – as himself
2001: Tutti frutti – as himself
2003: Guerre d'Algérie: la mémoire retrouvée? – as himself
2003: Ombre et lumière – as himself
2005: Graffiti 60 – as himself
2005: Mamy Scopitone – L'âge d'or du clip – as himself (also archive footage)

Bibliography
 Martin Monestier, Enrico Macias, l'enfant de tous pays, 1980
 Enrico Macias and Jacques Demarny, Non, je n’ai pas oublié, 1982
 Enrico Macias and Françoise Assouline, Mon Algérie, 2001
 Enrico Macia and Cheb Mami, Koum Tara Live Au Grand Rex, 2004
 Gérard Calmettes, Rien que du bleu, 2005
 Musicien de cœur, preface by Jacques Leyris, Éditions Horizon, 2005
 Armand Carval, Enrico Macias, Un homme libre pour la Paix (180 Pages), 2008
 Armand Carval, Enrico Macias, Le Chanteur de la Paix (200 pages), 2009
 Armand Carval, Enrico Macias, Le Chanteur de la Paix (180 pages), second edition, 2010
 Idir and Enrico Macias, Cnu ay afṛux (Achenu Aya Frukh) (le duo berbère Kabylie), 2011
 Enrico Macias, "L'envers du ciel bleu", 2015

References

External links

 
 Enrico Macias Biography at RFI Musique

20th-century French Sephardi Jews
21st-century French Sephardi Jews
1938 births
Living people
Algerian Jews
French male singers
People from Constantine, Algeria
Jewish singers
Pathé-Marconi artists
Pieds-Noirs
French Zionists